Wissington may refer to:

Wissington, Suffolk
Wissington, Norfolk